Runa LLC is a privately held organic Amazonian beverage company that processes and sells guayusa. The company is based in Brooklyn, New York, with offices in Quito and Archidona, Ecuador. It was founded in 2008 by two Brown University graduates, Daniel MacCombie and Tyler Gage. The company operates the world's only guayusa processing facility, which is located in Archidona.

Runa began selling bagged guayusa on the East Coast in October 2010 in natural food stores and supermarkets. In September 2010, the company received its USDA organic certification. A certified Benefit corporation, Runa purchases guayusa directly from indigenous farmers who own their own land in a model following Fair Trade principles.  Runa received its fair trade certification in 2011.

In 2018, Runa was acquired by All Market Inc., maker of Vita Coco Coconut Water.

Products 
Runa offers a variety of blends of guayusa for retail sale in the form of energy drinks, bottled iced teas, tea boxes, and loose leaf teas, all of which are USDA certified organic, Kosher certified, plantation farming, and non-GMO certified.

Energy drinks

Released in 2013, Runa Clean Energy uses highly concentrated guayusa as its base ingredient. The 8.4 oz cans contain 120 mg of caffeine and high levels of antioxidants. The energy drinks come lightly carbonated in three flavors: sweetened Berry, no-sugar added Orange Passion , or unsweetened with lime, the zero-calorie Original. In mid-2015, Runa Clean Energy has begun to release a 12 oz size of the Runa Clean Energy Berry flavor which contains 171 mg of caffeine per can.

Nutritional information: 
Runa Clean Energy Berry (8.4 oz can): 80 calories, 19g Total Carbohydrates (17g sugar)
Runa Clean Energy Berry (12 oz can): 110 calories, 27g Total Carbohydrates (25g sugar)
Runa Clean Energy No Sugar Added Orange Passion (8.4 oz can): 10 calories, 1g Total Carbohydrates (1g sugar) 
Runa Clean Energy Original (or Original Zero) Unsweetened with Lime (8.4oz can): 0 calories, 0 Total Carbohydrates (0g sugar)

Ready-to-drink bottled tea

Runa offers nine flavors of ready-to-drink beverages: six lightly sweetened flavors–Hibiscus-Berry, Lemon-Lemongrass, Sweet Peach, Raspberry, Mint, and Traditional Guayusa, two unsweetened flavors–Lime and Guava, and a Half & Half (Half Tea/Half Lemonade) flavor.

Pyramid infusers

Runa offers three flavors: traditional, hibiscus berry, and sage lavender.

Tea boxes

Runa tea boxes come in four flavors: Traditional Guayusa, Mint Guayusa, Ginger-Citrus Guayusa, and Cinnamon Lemongrass Guayusa.

Loose-leaf tea

Loose-leaf guayusa comes in four flavors: Traditional Guayusa, Cinnamon-Lemongrass Guayusa, Mint Guayusa, Ginger-Citrus Guayusa.

Guayusa

Health benefits

Guayusa claims to contain "the same amount of caffeine as one cup of coffee". Guayusa also contains theobromine.

Social mission 
Runa purchases its guayusa from 600 indigenous Kichwa farmers in the Napo and Pastaza provinces of the Ecuadorian Amazon and pays a guaranteed minimum price to farmers. Runa also provides technical assistance and training programs to smallholder farmers through its team of eight indigenous field technicians. Farmers receive direct market access and training in sustainable agriculture and reforestation.

Runa's non-profit arm, Runa Foundation, provides tools and resources to indigenous communities and farmers' associations to increase access to markets and encourage sustainable agricultural practices. It focuses on social empowerment, community development, and environmental management.

Awards 
Runa won Brown University's Business Plan Competition and the Rhode Island Business Plan Competition and received second place in the William James Foundation's Socially Responsible Business Plan Competition.

References

External links 
 Runa Foundation (Fundación Runa)
 Runa Website

Drink companies of the United States
Herbal tea